Nicholas Hudson may refer to:

Nicholas Hudson (bishop) (born 1959), English (Roman Catholic) titular bishop of St Germans and auxiliary bishop of Westminster 
Nicholas Hudson (athlete), Australian 800m runner
Nicohlas Hudson, a fictional character in Another World

See also
Nick Hudson (disambiguation)